Moonby House is a heritage-listed colonial pastoral station and now retirement village located on the New England Highway in Kootingal in the Tamworth Regional Council local government area of New South Wales, Australia. The house was built from 1895 to 1896. It is also known as Moonbi Retirement Homes. The property is owned by the Freemasons Institution of NSW and was added to the New South Wales State Heritage Register on 2 April 1999.

History 
Through the process of "squatting" on Crown land, squatters had occupied most of the Peel Valley and adjacent Moonbi Ranges by the late 1830s.

Henry Dangar was company surveyor for the Australian Agricultural Company and was the influencing factor in convincing Edward Parry (company agent for the Australian Agricultural Company) to exchange the coastal and mountainous lands at Port Stephens for the better pastoral lands of the Peel Valley.

Pastoral runs were open range country, with a head station that was the heart of the enterprise. Moonby House was erected by the Gill family, which had made their money both from mail contracting and from pastoralism. This was the expression of that wealth at the end of the nineteenth century. Robert Alfred Orvill Gill built the house during 1895-96, of double brick made near the river, on the property Tangelwood.

In 1970 Moonby House was restored by "Artificial Breeders Ltd." who made it the administrative headquarters of a cattle artificial insemination centre.

In 1977 the Masonic Lodge conceived to change it to a retirement village. In 1978 the Freemasons Benevolent Institution of NSW purchased the property to establish the Northern Inland Masonic Retirement Centre - as a residential aged care facility. At the time of the study Moonbi House was still being utilised for that purpose.

Description 
It is well-sited with views across the countryside to the Moonbi Ranges. Moonby House is now located within a retirement village.

Moonby House has a long driveway leading onto Churchill Drive, included as part of its curtilage.

Moonby House, constructed between 1895 and 1896, is representative of the development of the pastoral expansion of the Parry Shire, and is also an outstanding example of a pastoral manor house in the Federation Filigree style. It is important to the local community as a landmark item and is associated with the historical figures Henry Dangar (original lease holder) and the Gill Family (original owners of the house). It is also developing additional social and cultural importance associated with its current use as a retirement village.

A substantial and well-detailed house featuring an interesting transitional architectural style.

Heritage listing 
Moonby House was listed on the New South Wales State Heritage Register on 2 April 1999.

See also 

Australian residential architectural styles

References

Bibliography

Attribution 

New South Wales State Heritage Register
Kootingal, New South Wales
Retirement communities
Houses in New South Wales
Farms in New South Wales
Articles incorporating text from the New South Wales State Heritage Register
Masonic buildings in New South Wales
1896 establishments in Australia
Houses completed in 1896
Squatting in Australia